Kampong Mata-Mata is a village in Brunei-Muara District, Brunei, and a neighbourhood in the capital Bandar Seri Begawan. The population was 6,126 in 2016. It is one of the villages within Mukim Gadong 'B'. The postcode is BE1718.

Geography 
Mata-Mata is located in the central part of Brunei-Muara District. It is also located on the outskirts of Bandar Seri Begawan, thus functions as a suburb of the capital. It neighbours the settlements of Katok to the north and Beribi to the south-east.

Mata-Mata consists of three main clusters of settlements, namely: Mata-Mata (original settlement), Perpindahan Mata-Mata and Mata-Mata Landless Indigenous Citizens' Housing Scheme. Perpindahan Mata-Mata (literally 'Mata-Mata Relocation') is a housing area established for a group of village residents in Kampong Ayer who had been relocated to live on land. Mata-Mata Landless Indigenous Citizens' Housing Scheme is also known as Katok 'B' Landless Indigenous Citizens' Housing Scheme even though the settlement is not contiguous to the original Katok settlement area.

Administration 
Apart from being a village subvidision, Kampong Mata-Mata has also been subsumed under the municipal area of the capital Bandar Seri Begawan.

Education 
The levels of education available in Mata-Mata only include primary and secondary. There are a few public primary schools as well as Katok Secondary School which are run by the government's education ministry.

The  or Islamic religious primary education, which has been made compulsory for Muslim pupils in Brunei, is also available in Mata-Mata. They are provided in a few religious schools which share grounds with the primary schools in Mata-Mata and they are run by the Ministry of Religious Affairs.

Within Mata-Mata is also located Raja Isteri Pengiran Anak Hajah Saleha Girls' Secondary Arabic Religious School, a government secondary school. However, it is a specialised school providing Islamic religious education and taught in Arabic; it is also run by the religious affairs ministry.

Religion

Place of worship 
They primarily serve the Muslim residents for the Jumu'ah or weekly Friday prayers.

References 

Villages in Brunei-Muara District
Neighbourhoods in Bandar Seri Begawan